Madea Gets a Job is a 2012 American stage play created, written, produced, and directed by Tyler Perry. It stars Tyler Perry as Madea "Mabel" Simmons and Patrice Lovely as Hattie. The live performance released on DVD (February 5, 2013) was recorded live in Atlanta at the Cobb Energy Performing Arts Centre on June 6 - 7, 2012.

Plot
Hard times (and the judge) caught up with Madea and she is forced to come out of retirement to go to work. Remember, since she is still on probation, Madea is not a star candidate for employment. A job at a nursing home would make Madea's employer never be the same after one day.

Shows

Cancellation of Shows 
On September 17, 2012, Tyler Perry posted a message to his website stating that the last leg of the "Madea Gets A Job" tour was cancelled due to "circumstances that he couldn't control". He stated that he originally lowered the ticket prices of each show to $25 so they are affordable for everyone to purchase. But then, additional fees were added onto the price of the tickets which almost doubled. Also, at the time, many folks were being led onto "ticket bootleggers" who bought lots of shows and sold them for double or triple the price. Perry also mentions that he has encountered many false impersonators on Facebook trying to charge people $150 to do a "meet and greet" on the tour.

Cast 

Tyler Perry as Madea
 Patrice Lovely as Hattie
 Cheryl "Pepsii" Riley as Carla Montgomery
 Chandra Currelley-Young as Barbara
 Melonie Daniels-Walker as Mrs. Watson
 Tony Grant as Allen
 Tamar Davis as Dalia
 Tony Hightower as Malik
 Maurice Lauchner as Carson
 Jeffery Lewis as Sam
 Stephanie Ferrett as Sue Ellen
 Alexis Jones as Rebecca

The Band 

 Ronnie Garrett - Musical Director / Bass Guitar
 Derek Scott - Guitar
 Marcus Williams - Drums
 Michael Burton - Saxophone
 Justin Gilbert - Keyboards
 Darius Fentress - Percussion
 Natalie Ragins - Keyboards
 Melvin Jones - Trumpet
 Saunders Sermons - Trombone
 Greg Kirkland - Background Vocals
 Zuri Craig - Background Vocals
 Latayvia Cherry - Background Vocals

Musical numbers
All songs written and/or produced by Tyler Perry and Elvin D. Ross.
 "Grandma's Hands" – Entire Cast
 "Unbelievable" – Malik and Dalia
 "All I Want Is Love" – Carla
 "They Just Left Me" – Barbara and Carson
 "Where Did The Time Go" – Hattie
 "Run to Me" – Allen
 "Please Don't Pass Me By" – Entire Cast

Post-Show Concert 

 "Before I Let Go" - Tony Grant
 "Cry Together" - Tony Hightower
 'He Loves Me" - Tamar Davis
 "Dr. Feelgood" - Cheryl Pepsii Riley
 "Something He Can Feel" - Patrice Lovely
 "Me, Myself and I" - Alexis Jones
 "Can You Stand the Rain" - Tyler Perry
 "What Have You Done for Me Lately" - Melonie Daniels-Walker
 "How Can I Ease the Pain" - Stephanie Ferrett
 "Reasons" - Jeffery Lewis
 "Let It Be" - Maurice Lauchner and Chandra Currelley-Young

External links
Tyler Perry Official website

Plays by Tyler Perry
2012 plays
African-American plays